Mohamed Kamara (born 1987), is a Sierra Leonean football midfielder

Mohamed Kamara may also refer to:

Mohamed Lamin Kamara (born 1943), Sierra Leonean politician
Mohamed Kamara (footballer, born 1981), Sierra Leonean football midfielder who played in Russia
Mohamed Kamara (weightlifter) (born 1987), Sierra Leonean weightlifter
Mohamed Kamara (footballer, born 1999), Sierra Leonean football goalkeeper

See also
Mohamed Camara (disambiguation)
Mohammed Kamara (born 1997), Liberian football forward